The geographical center of Earth is the geometric center of all land surfaces on Earth. Geometrically defined it is the Centroid of all land surfaces within the two dimensions of the Geoid surface which approximates the Earth's outer shape. The term center of minimum distance specifies the concept more precisely as the domain is the sphere surface without boundary and not the sphere as three-dimensional body.

Explained in a different way, it is the location on the surface of Earth where the sum of distances to all locations on land is the smallest. If you had an airplane with an infinite energy resource and fly from one start location on Earth to one location on a land surface somewhere on Earth and back again and repeat that from the same start location to all possible destination locations, the starting locations where the total travel distance sums up as the smallest, marks the geographical center of Earth.

Its distance definition follows the shortest path on the surface of Earth along the Great Circle (orthodrome).

History of the concept 

He stated that this had been calculated by "carefully summing up all the dry land habitable by man all the wide world over".

In October of that year, Smyth proposed to position the prime meridian at the longitude of the Great Pyramid because there it would "pass over more land than [at] any other [location]". He also argued the cultural significance of the location and its vicinity to Jerusalem. The expert committee deciding the issue, however, voted for Greenwich because "so many ships used the port of London".

In 2003, a new calculation based on a global digital elevation model obtained from satellite measurements , ETOPO2,  whose data points are spaced 2′ (3.7 km at the equator) led to the result ♁ 41°  N , 35°  E and thus validating Wood's calculation.

Differentiation from other definitions and calculations 
Various definitions of geographical centers exists. The definition used by the references in this article refer to calculations within the 2 dimensions of a surface, mainly as the surface of Earth is the domain of human cultural existence. Other definitions refer to calculations based on three-dimensional objects, for example the Newtonian gravity center of the whole Earth (physical Barycenter) or the Newtonian gravity center of only the continents as uniform thick three-dimensional objects. Those centers can be found inside Earth mostly near its core. A projection of those centers towards the surface would be then an alternative definition of the geographical center, some of those calculations result in a surface location projection not that far away from the geographical center.

See also 
 Center of the universe (disambiguation)
 History of the center of the Universe
 Land and water hemispheres
 Omphalos of Delphi (ancient Greeks' navel of the Earth)

References 

Earth